Michael North is an American literary critic and a professor in the department of English at the University of California, Los Angeles.

Background
North received a B.A. from Stanford University in 1973 and Ph.D. from the University of Connecticut in 1980. North taught at the College of William and Mary before joining the University of California, Los Angeles in 1991.

He became a member of the American Academy of Arts and Sciences in 2012.

Publications
 Novelty: A History of the New, Chicago: The University of Chicago Press, 2013
 Machine-Age Comedy, 2009
 Camera Works: Photography and the Twentieth-Century Word, 2005
 Reading 1922: A Return to the Scene of the Modern, 2002
 The Waste Land: A Norton Critical Edition, 2000 (editor)
 The Dialect of Modernism: Race, Language, and Twentieth-Century Literature, 1994
 The Political Aesthetic of Yeats, Eliot, and Pound, 1992
 Henry Green and the Writing of His Generation,1984

See also
 Modernist literature
 Modernist poetry

External links
 Official website

Modernism
American literary critics
University of Connecticut alumni
Stanford University alumni
University of California, Los Angeles faculty
College of William & Mary faculty
Living people
American academics of English literature
Fellows of the American Academy of Arts and Sciences
Year of birth missing (living people)